Sepp Reif (5 September 1937 - 2 March 2023 in Pulheim) was a German ice hockey player. He competed in the men's tournaments at the 1960 Winter Olympics, the 1964 Winter Olympics and the 1968 Winter Olympics.

References

External links

1937 births
2023 deaths
Ice hockey players at the 1960 Winter Olympics
Ice hockey players at the 1964 Winter Olympics
Ice hockey players at the 1968 Winter Olympics
Olympic ice hockey players of Germany
Olympic ice hockey players of the United Team of Germany
Olympic ice hockey players of West Germany
Sportspeople from Munich